Yar Pyae is a Burmese military officer and the Minister for the Union Government Office as of 11 May 2021. He was appointed as the National Security Advisor on 22 May 2021.

Early life and education 
Yar Pyae graduated from the 22nd intake of the Defence Services Academy, in the same cohort as Soe Win.

Military career 
In November 2020, he chaired the Peace Negotiation Committee of Tatmadaw and also headed the Joint Ceasefire Monitoring Committee.

In the aftermath of the 2021 Myanmar coup d'état, Yar Pyae has led efforts to dissuade major ethnic armed organisations, including United Wa State Army and the Shan State Progress Party, from joining the resistance movement and the National Unity Government. As the chairman of the National Solidarity and Peace-making Committee (NSPC), he met with the Democratic Karen Buddhist Army (DKBA) and the Karen National Union/Karen National Liberation Army (Peace Council) at the National Reconciliation and Peace Center in Nay Pyi Taw on 26 April 2021.

In August 2021, Sun Guoxiang, China's special envoy for Asian Affairs, met with Yar Pyae (along with military ruler Min Aung Hlaing and foreign minister Wunna Maung Lwin) and “exchanged views with them on the political landscape in Myanmar”.

References 

Burmese generals
Living people
Government ministers of Myanmar
Year of birth missing (living people)